Ché Wolton Grant (born 4 March 1994), known professionally as AJ Tracey, is a British rapper, singer, songwriter, and record producer. He is from Ladbroke Grove, West London. Tracey rose to popularity in 2016 and was listed by The Guardian in a list of "best new acts to catch at festivals in 2016".

Tracey's first mainstream EP, Secure the Bag! (2017) entered the UK Albums Chart at number thirteen. In 2018, Tracey released the single "Butterflies" featuring British rapper Not3s which served as his commercial breakthrough, peaking in the top 20 on the UK Singles Chart. His self-titled debut album, which was released in 2019 by Warner Records, received critical acclaim and peaked at number three on the UK Albums Chart. It featured his highest-charting single as a solo artist, "Ladbroke Grove", which peaked at number three on the UK Singles Chart and was certified platinum by the BPI.

Early life 
Grant was born in Brixton and raised in Ladbroke Grove, West London. Grant's father, of Afro-Trinidadian origin, is a former rapper, and his Welsh mother is a former jungle DJ. He was named by his mother after the revolutionary Che Guevara.

He has been rapping since the age of six. He was educated locally at Middle Row Primary school and went on to attend Holland Park School. He dropped out of a criminology course at London Metropolitan University to pursue his music career. He is an avid supporter of Tottenham Hotspur.

Career

2011–16: Emergence and EPs 
Under the stage names Looney and Loonz, Tracey's music can be found online dating back to June 2011. An early SoundCloud account, Looney Tell 'Em, contains eleven tracks, each with free downloads enabled. These include four songs from the scrapped grime EP The Dungeon (featuring non-exclusive beats from Spooky and Rude Kid) and two songs from Didn't Make the Cut, originally slated for release on the scrapped hip hop mixtape Fuck a Fairytale. His debut mixtape, Didn't Make the Cut, was released 13 September 2012, and comprises 21 UK rap and grime songs and freestyles which, in his own words, are "the tracks that didn't make it onto my actual mixtape". The project was initially to be titled Scirocco Musik and its artwork still reflects this title. In August 2013, his collective, My Team Paid, announced that they were to release a joint mixtape entitled My Team Paid. One single, "Clouded Skies", emerged, but the project was ultimately scrapped. Tracey's second mixtape, No More Looney, was released through DatPiff on 30 August 2014. The project includes thirty-three tracks, many of which feature fellow My Team Paid members Big Zuu, Jay Amo, Wax and Sketch.

Tracey first gained attention through appearances on pirate radio stations and the release of his debut EP The Front in mid-2015. In December 2015, Tracey released his second EP Alex Moran, which featured acclaimed tracks including "Spirit Bomb" and "Naila". BBC Radio 1Xtra DJ Sian Anderson also played "Swerve and Skid" heavily on her show during 2015, which was the first song of his that was on commercial radio. During this period, Tracey also recorded (but did not release) a trap EP entitled Rain. In 2016, Tracey – a Tottenham Hotspur fan – appeared in promotional material for BT Sport's coverage of the Premier League. He also collaborated with Dave over a remix of Ruff Sqwad's Pied Piper to create a well received track entitled "Thiago Silva".

2017–2020: Secure the Bag! and self-titled album 

In October 2017, Tracey released his fifth EP, Secure the Bag!. He also began producing records that year. He made his production debut on "LA4AWEEK", co-produced by Nyge and released in April 2017, and later produced label-mate Big Zuu's "Tell Man Twice", released in August 2017.

In early 2018, AJ Tracey modelled for the OVO clothing line in 2018. In May 2018, Tracey released the single "Butterflies" featuring Not3s. The song served as AJ Tracey's commercial breakthrough, peaking at number 19 on the UK Singles Chart. The single was followed up with "Lo(v/s)er", which peaked at number 38. Tracey also featured on Craig David's album "The Time is now" collaborating on the track "Somebody like me". In early July 2019 the Swedish rapper  released his second album, Mer än rap ("more than rap"). Tracey was featured on the title track "More Than Rap".

On 21 November 2018, Tracey announced the pre-order of his self-titled debut album, released on 8 February 2019. The lead single, "Doing It", was released for streaming and digital on the same day. Four more singles were released to promote AJ Tracey: "Butterflies" featuring Not3s, "Psych Out!", "Necklace" featuring Jay Critch and "Ladbroke Grove". AJ Tracey debuted at number three on the UK Albums Chart and is certified Silver by the British Phonographic Industry (BPI). "Ladbroke Grove" became Tracey's highest-charting single peaking at number three on the UK Singles Chart. On 10 October 2019, Tracey announced the upcoming release of a deluxe edition of AJ Tracey, to feature five new songs and a couple of surprises. The album was released on 25 October. On 14 February 2020, AJ Tracey announced his Australian tour starting in Adelaide on 24 April, but was later postponed due to the COVID-19 pandemic.

2020–present: Secure the Bag! 2 and Flu Game 
On 6 October 2020, AJ Tracey released the tracklist for his sixth EP, Secure the Bag! 2 on Twitter and was later released on 27 November 2020. The EP debuted at number 75 on the UK Albums Charts.

On 4 February 2021, Tracey featured on the track "Bringing It Back" by Digga D. The song topped the UK Chart's Official Trending Chart and debuted at number 5 on the UK Singles Chart.

On 22 March 2021, Tracey announced via a fake press conference on YouTube his second studio album titled Flu Game as well as the album's tracklist, which was released on 16 April 2021. The album includes singles such as "Dinner Guest", "West Ten", "Anxious" and "Bringing It Back". Five hours prior to the release of the album, AJ released the single "Little More Love" as well as releasing a music video on YouTube.

On 26 August 2021, Tracey was featured on the Gorillaz track "Jimmy Jimmy" from their Meanwhile EP.

Politics 

In June 2017, Tracey endorsed Labour Party leader Jeremy Corbyn in the 2017 UK general election. In a Labour Party campaign video he said: "The Labour Party strongly support the youth in following their dreams and giving people a chance." He added: "In my opinion we need a Labour government to give young people a hope, a chance for their future and I genuinely believe that Corbyn is the man to do it."

In an October 2019 interview with The Observer, Tracey voiced concerns about climate change and said: "If I'm voting for anyone now it's the Green Party."

Discography 

AJ Tracey (2019)
Flu Game (2021)

References

External links 
 

1994 births
Living people
Alumni of London Metropolitan University
Black British male rappers
British dancehall musicians
British trap musicians
English male rappers
English people of Trinidad and Tobago descent
English people of Welsh descent
English pop singers
English record producers
Grime music artists
Labour Party (UK) people
People from the Royal Borough of Kensington and Chelsea
Rappers from London
People from Ladbroke Grove
UK garage musicians
UK drill musicians